Smilin' is the thirteenth overall and eighth North American album by the a cappella group Rockapella. It is legendary bass Barry Carl's last album as a member of the group and the first appearance of Carl's successor, George Baldi III. It was re-released on Shakariki Records in 2004.

Track listing

Personnel
Scott Leonard – high tenor
Kevin Wright – tenor
Elliott Kerman – baritone
Barry Carl – bass
George Baldi III – bass
Jeff Thacher – vocal percussion

Special Appearances
Sean Altman - "Shambala"
Eli Kerman – "Summertime Blues", "No Doubt At All"
Natalie Leonard – "Millennial Lady"

2002 albums
Rockapella albums